The 1978 World Junior Curling Championships were held from March 10 to 17 in Grindelwald, Switzerland for men's teams only.

Teams

Round robin

  Teams to playoffs
  Teams to tiebreaker

Tiebreaker

Playoffs

Final standings

Awards
 WJCC Sportsmanship Award:  Colin Hamilton

All-Star Team:
Skip:  Paul Gowsell
Third:  Douglas Edwardson
Second:  Douglas McFarlane
Lead:  David Ramsay

References

External links
Coverage of the final on YouTube

1978 in Swiss sport
1978 in curling
World Junior Curling Championships
Sports competitions in Grindelwald
International curling competitions hosted by Switzerland
March 1978 sports events in Europe
1978 in youth sport